Guadalupe County is a county  in the U.S. state of New Mexico. As of the 2010 census, the population was 4,687, making it the fifth-least populous county in New Mexico. Its county seat is Santa Rosa.

History
Guadalupe County was named after Nuestra Señora de Guadalupe (Our Lady of Guadalupe) or after the Mesita de Guadalupe (Guadalupe Plain). The county was created from the southern portion of San Miguel County February 26, 1891 by an act of the New Mexico Territorial Legislature. The original county seat was Puerto De Luna, but was moved north to Santa Rosa in 1903. That same year, after the popular Spanish–American War of 1898, the county's name was changed to Leonard Wood County after the Presidential physician, Major-General in the Rough Riders, and recipient of the Medal of Honor. The name was later changed back to Guadalupe County. The County contains whole, or parts of, several previous Spanish land grants to include the Aqua Negra, the Jose Perea, the Anton Chico, and the Preston Beck land grants.

Geography

Adjacent counties
 San Miguel County – north
 Quay County – east
 De Baca County – south
 Lincoln County – south
 Torrance County – west

Demographics

2000 census
As of the 2000 census, there were 4,680 people, 1,655 households, and 1,145 families living in the county.  The population density was 2 people per square mile (1/km2).  There were 2,160 housing units at an average density of 1 per square mile (0/km2). The racial makeup of the county was 54.1% White, 1.3% Black or African American, 1.1% Native American, 0.5% Asian, nil% Pacific Islander, 39.1% from other races, and 3.6% from two or more races. 81.2% of the population were Hispanic or Latino of any race.

There were 1,655 households, out of which 33.8% had children under the age of 18 living with them, 49.5% were married couples living together, 14.3% had a female householder with no husband present, and 30.8% were non-families. 27.9% of all households were made up of individuals, and 11.5% had someone living alone who was 65 years of age or older.  The average household size was 2.51 and the average family size was 3.05.

In the county, the population was spread out, with 24.4% under the age of 18, 9.2% from 18 to 24, 30.7% from 25 to 44, 21.9% from 45 to 64, and 13.8% who were 65 years of age or older.  The median age was 38 years. For every 100 females there were 121.5 males.  For every 100 females age 18 and over, there were 126.3 males.

The median income for a household in the county was $24,783, and the median income for a family was $28,279. Males had a median income of $22,463 versus $18,500 for females. The per capita income for the county was $11,241.  About 18.1% of families and 21.60% of the population were below the poverty line, including 24.1% of those under age 18 and 19.4% of those age 65 or over.

2010 census
As of the 2010 census, there were 4,687 people, 1,766 households, and 1,114 families living in the county. The racial makeup of the county was 70.4% white, 1.9% American Indian, 1.7% black or African American, 1.3% Asian, 21.4% from other races, and 3.3% from two or more races. Those of Hispanic or Latino origin made up 79.6% of the population. In terms of ancestry, 8.3% were German, and 2.4% were American.

Of the 1,766 households, 30.6% had children under the age of 18 living with them, 40.9% were married couples living together, 15.2% had a female householder with no husband present, 36.9% were non-families, and 32.4% of all households were made up of individuals. The average household size was 2.33 and the average family size was 2.93. The median age was 40.1 years.

The median income for a household in the county was $28,488 and the median income for a family was $37,535. Males had a median income of $36,494 versus $23,984 for females. The per capita income for the county was $13,710. About 21.7% of families and 28.2% of the population were below the poverty line, including 46.7% of those under age 18 and 27.4% of those age 65 or over.

Communities

City
 Santa Rosa (county seat)

Town
 Vaughn

Census-designated places
 Anton Chico
 Llano del Medio
 Newkirk
 Pastura
 Puerto de Luna

Politics
Guadalupe County leans Democratic, and has voted for that party's presidential nominee in every election since 1988.

Education
The county has two school districts serving sections: Santa Rosa Consolidated Schools and Vaughn Municipal Schools.

See also
 National Register of Historic Places listings in Guadalupe County, New Mexico

References

External links
 Profile from the National Association of Counties

 
1891 establishments in New Mexico Territory
Populated places established in 1891
Hispanic and Latino American culture in New Mexico